Leutenegger is a Germanic surname that may refer to:

Brigitte Leutenegger, Swiss curler
Catherine Leutenegger (born 1983), Swiss visual artist and photographer
Gertrud Leutenegger (born 1948), German-speaking Swiss poet, novelist, playwright and theatre director
Hans Leutenegger (born 1940), Swiss bobsledder, 1972 Winter Olympic champion
Susanne Leutenegger Oberholzer (born 1948), Swiss politician